Song X is a collaborative studio album by American jazz guitarist Pat Metheny and saxophonist Ornette Coleman. It is a free jazz record that was produced in a three-day recording session in 1985. The album was released in June 1986 by Geffen Records.

Background 
Metheny was a longtime admirer of the saxophonist, recording Coleman compositions on Bright Size Life (1976) and 80/81 (1980). During the three weeks leading up to the recording, Coleman and Metheny spent "between 6 and 12 hours a day every day, playing, hanging out and talking, trying to come up with a vocabulary for this particular session ... that would be different."

Coleman's saxophone tone, when combined with a saxophone preset on Metheny's guitar synthesizer (which he had modified), created an "ensemble blend [that] was surprising to both of us."

The album features bassist Charlie Haden (a frequent Coleman collaborator who'd also played on 80/81), Jack DeJohnette on drums, and Coleman's son Denardo on drums and various percussion instruments. It was recorded at The Power Station in New York City between December 12 and December 14, 1985. A remixed and remastered version was issued on CD in August 2005, titled Song X: Twentieth Anniversary. Six unreleased tracks were added prior to the original eight songs.

Critical reception 

Reviewing Song X in 1986 for The Village Voice, Robert Christgau deemed it Coleman's best album of unadulterated jazz since the early 1970s and believed Metheny's mild mannered style of jazz kept the music uncluttered compared to some of Coleman's recent work. "No rock moves, and no funk, harmolodic or otherwise", Christgau added. "It's all sweet lyricism, sonic comedy, and headlong invention." Down Beat magazine hailed the album as "a remarkable union of the true and the new, a fusion of the bedrock human sound of Ornette's alto with the sometimes jarring, mostly bracing electronic capabilities of Pat's guitar-synth". Jon Pareles wrote in The New York Times that the experiment succeeded because both artists were masterful melodists, finding the record "less tangled and more directly songful than Mr. Coleman's recent albums with Prime Time". Song X was voted the nineteenth best album of 1986 in The Village Voices annual Pazz & Jop critics poll.

In The Penguin Guide to Jazz (2004), Richard Cook and Brian Morton said the more adventurous recordings on Song X showcased the jubilant playing between Coleman and Metheny, who not only "powered his way through Coleman's itinerary with utter conviction, he set up opportunities for the saxophonist to resolve and created a fusion with which Coleman's often impenetrable Prime Time bands had failed to come to terms." In a review of the album's 2005 reissue, Christgau wrote in Blender that all six bonus tracks were "strong enough to justify kicking off with them, and the perfect warm-up to an album Metheny was right to construct exactly as he did." In his list for 2005 Pazz & Jop poll, he named its twentieth anniversary edition the sixteenth best album of the year.

Track listing

Note
 Tracks 1–6 are unreleased new tracks.

Personnel
Credits are adapted from Muze.

 Pat Metheny – guitar, guitar synthesizer, liner notes
 Ornette Coleman – alto saxophone, violin
 Charlie Haden – double bass
 Jack DeJohnette – drums
 Denardo Coleman – drums, percussion

Technical staff
 Ted Jensen – audio remastering
 David A. Cantor – photography

Charts
Album – Billboard

References

External links 
 

1986 albums
Ornette Coleman albums
Pat Metheny albums
Geffen Records albums
Free jazz albums